Covarachía is a town and municipality in the Northern Boyacá Province, part of the Colombian Department of Boyacá. The municipality borders San José de Miranda and Capitanejo (both Santander) in the north, Tipacoque in the south, Capitanejo in the east and in the west the municipalities Onzaga and San Joaquín (Santander).

Etymology 
The name Covarachía is a combination of Spanish and Chibcha; "cave of the Moon", with Chía referring to the Moon goddess Chía.

History 
Covarachía was inhabited by indigenous people during the Herrera Period, and later, in the northeasternmost part of the Muisca Confederation, ruled by a cacique. Covarachía is bordered by the Chicamocha River and the territories to the east of the town were inhabited by the Lache people. The Muisca were the people who lived on the Altiplano Cundiboyacense before the Spanish conquest of the Muisca in the 1530s.

Modern Covarachía, called Ricaurte between 1858 and 1869, was founded on February 10, 1823, by Juan Zámano and Felipe Pérez.

Economy 
Main economical activities of Covarachía are agriculture and livestock farming. Important agricultural products are tobacco, fique, pineapples, yuca, maize, peas, sugarcane, tomatoes and melons.

References 

Municipalities of Boyacá Department
Populated places established in 1823
Muisca Confederation
Muysccubun